is a Japanese professional baseball pitcher who currently plays for the Hanshin Tigers of Nippon Professional Baseball. He previously pitched for the Orix Buffaloes from 2017 to August 2020.

Early baseball career
Born in Brussels to Japanese parents, his family moved back to their hometown in Sakura, Chiba when Keisuke was 2 after his father's work assignment in Belgium was finished.  He started playing little league baseball for Aosuge Elementary School, and continued as a pitcher for Yachiyo Shoin High but his school never made it past the prefectural tournaments.

He enrolled in a business course in Tokyo University of Information Sciences and regularly pitched in the Chiba Prefecture University Baseball League. He became the ace pitcher in his 3rd year and led his team to win the league championships by topping the league in wins (5) and also got awarded Best Nine. They made it to the 2013 National Collegiate Baseball Championship tournament but did not make it past the first round when he allowed 3 runs from the opponent. He also topped the league in wins in his final year with 6.

When he went undrafted after college, he joined Nihon Seimei to play in the industrial leagues. In 2015, he helped his team win their 3rd championship in the Intercity Baseball Tournament and won the MVP award for only giving up 1 run in 4 games and 12 innings.

Orix Buffaloes
He was the Buffaloes' 5th round pick during the 2016 NPB draft. He signed a 40 million yen contract with Orix, for an estimated annual salary of 10 million yen. He was assigned jersey number 39.

2017 

He debuted as a 7th inning reliever in the May 13 match against the Lions in Kyocera dome, and gave away 2 runs in one inning. After that shaky start, he did not get another outing until the bullpen was depleted in a 10-inning deadlock against the Swallows on May 31. He held the Swallows scoreless and earned his first win when the Buffaloes hit the walk-off run. He continued to appear as a middle reliever in the following months, until he sustained an injury from a batted liner that hit his right temple on September 30. He collapsed on the mound while bleeding, and an ambulance had to be brought inside Kyocera Dome to rush him to the hospital. While CT scan results did not show any anomalies in his skull or eye, he still needed 8 stitches to close the wound that resulted from the impact. This outing ended his season and he finished with 3.98 ERA, 2-1 and 1 hold in 35 games. 

2018 
He spent most of the season pitching in the Phoenix League (farms), and only had 7 outings with the main squad.

2019 
He appeared in 20 games as a reliever, and finished with 3 holds, 2 loses and a 5.71 ERA.

2020
He had 7 outings with the main squad before he was suddenly traded to the Hanshin Tigers on August 28 in exchange for lefty pitcher Yuya Iida. This happened after team manager Norifumi Nishimura stepped down from his post after the Buffaloes fell to the bottom of the rankings with 16-33, and was replaced by farm manager Satoshi Nakajima on August 21.

Hanshin Tigers

2020   
He had 2 scoreless outings as a reliever in his first season with the Tigers main squad.

Career Statistics
NPB Statistics

References

1992 births
Living people
Baseball people from Chiba Prefecture
Japanese baseball players
Nippon Professional Baseball pitchers
Hanshin Tigers players